This name uses Portuguese naming customs. the first or maternal family name is Saúde and the second or paternal family name is Maria.

Victor Saúde Maria (27 April 1939 – 25 October 1999) was a Bissau-Guinean politician.

Early life 
He was the country's first Foreign Minister (1974–1982) and then went on to be Prime Minister from 14 May 1982 until 10 March 1984, when he fled to Portugal after a power struggle with President João Bernardo Vieira fearing summary execution after hearing President Vieira accuse him of "High Treason".

Maria returned from exile in late 1990 and set up the United Social Democratic Party (PUSD) in 1992. He ran for President in 1994, placing seventh and receiving 2.07% of the vote. He led the PUSD until his assassination in 1999.

References

 

1939 births
1999 deaths
Vice presidents of Guinea-Bissau
Prime Ministers of Guinea-Bissau
Assassinated Bissau-Guinean politicians
People murdered in Guinea-Bissau
1999 murders in Africa
United Social Democratic Party politicians
African Party for the Independence of Guinea and Cape Verde politicians